Matvei S. Pogrebinsky (1892-1937) was a Russian revolutionary.

In the 1930s he was responsible for setting up many orphanages and communes for delinquent children, and was the man who founded the Bolshevo Commune. He was the inspiration for the very popular Soviet film, Putevka v Zhizn ("Path to Life") in 1931 . He was the head of the NKVD in the Gorky Oblast (Nizhny Novgorod) and in 1937 committed suicide in order to avoid "participation in lawlessness, as his suicide letter reveals."

In 1954 the scholar Alexander Orlov explained Pogrebinsky's suicide in a similar fashion, "Squeezed between the relentless discipline of the party and pangs of conscience, Pogrebinsky saw in suicide the only way out".  His suicide was similar to many officials during the Great Terror, as revolutionaries who could not deal with the terror of Stalinism saw suicide as the only escape.

Notes

See also
NKVD
Stalinism
Purge
Russian Revolution

NKVD officers
1892 births
1937 deaths
1937 suicides
Soviet people